Blue Rock Partners is a Tampa, Florida-based limited liability company (LLC) that invests in rental properties. Holdings include 6,400 units in the Tampa Bay area and Orlando, including approximately 2,300 units in Brandon, Florida. Blue Rock partners with Konover South LLC, based in Deerfield Beach, to do deals. Acquisitions include The Park at Dorchester apartment homes in Brandon.

In 2010, Blue Rock purchased the Mallard Cove apartment off Conway Road in south Orlando, for $14 million. In 2013, it bought a 366-unit apartment complex in Brandon. In 2013, the company also bought The Seasons, a 240-unit apartment community near the University of South Florida. It is to become The Park at Rialto after renovations.

References

External links
Blue Rock Partners website
Palm Springs Real Estate

Real estate companies of the United States
Companies based in Tampa, Florida